The 1931 Georgia Tech Yellow Jackets football team was an American football team that represented Georgia Tech as a member of the Southern Conference during the 1931 college football season. In their 12th season under head coach Grant Field, Georgia Tech compiled a 2–7–1 record.

Schedule

References

Georgia Tech
Georgia Tech Yellow Jackets football seasons
Georgia Tech